Congenital onychodysplasia of the index fingers is defined by the presence of the condition at birth, either unilateral or bilateral index finger involvement, variable distortion of the nail or lunula, and polyonychia, micronychia, anonychia, hemionychogryphosis, or malalignment.
The original paper was 
This condition is also called Iso-Kikuchi syndrome, since Iso was the first author who published it in a Japanese paper.

See also 
 List of cutaneous conditions

References

External links 

Conditions of the skin appendages